Škabrnja is a village in northern Dalmatia, Croatia, located halfway between Zadar and Benkovac in the lowland region of Ravni Kotari. Its municipality is also called Škabrnja, and it includes Škabrnja with a population of 1,413 as well as the smaller village of Prkos, population 363 with a total of 1,776 residents (2011 census). The total area of the municipality is 22.93 km2.

History

The first mention of "the forest of Škabrnje" dates from a medieval contract which mentions the village of Kamenjani located near Škabrnja. The village of Kamenjani itself was first mentioned in 1070, and the last time in 1700; it was a property of the Šubić family and located in the area around today's village cemetery.

The oldest two buildings in the village are the two Catholic churches: the church of St. Mary in the hamlet of Ambar, and the church of St. Luke at the village cemetery.
The church of St. Mary dates from the 11th century and is built from stone, forming a hexagonal shape, one of several such old Croatian churches from northern Dalmatian towns and villages. The church of St. Luke was built in the 13th century, with a Gothic dome dated 1440. It has a single nave which ends in an apsis, as well as a bell tower which was also built later.

According to the census of 1991, Škabrnja was inhabited by 1,953 people in 397 households, and the vast majority of them were Croats (97.59%). In November 1991, during the Croatian War of Independence, Škabrnja was attacked by the Yugoslav People's Army and Serb paramilitary forces, resulting in the Škabrnja massacre.

References

External links
 Skabrnja official site
 http://www.skabrnja.com/

Municipalities of Croatia
Populated places in Zadar County